John Pollexfen (1636–1715), of Walbrooke House in the parish of St Stephen Walbrook, City of London and of Wembury House in Devon, was a merchant, a courtier to Kings Charles II and William III, and a political economist who served four times as a Member of Parliament for Plympton Erle in Devon, in 1679, 1681, 1689 and 1690. He was opposed to the monopoly of the East India Company.

Origins
According to Eliott-Drake (1911), he was the second son of Andrew Pollexfen of Stancombe Dawney in the parish of Sherford, Devon, by his wife Joan Woollcombe (born 1607), a daughter of John Woollcombe (born 1577) (anciently "Woollocombe") of Pitton in the parish of Yealmpton in Devon, great-grandfather of John Woolcombe (d.1713), MP for Plymouth in 1702. He was a younger brother of Henry Pollexfen (1632-1691), of Nutwell in the parish of Woodbury, Devon, Lord Chief Justice of the Common Pleas. This parentage differs from that given in the pedigree in the Heraldic Visitations of Devon (1895 edition), which therefore appears unreliable. Andrew was a younger grandson of John Pollexfen of Kitley in the parish of Yealmpton in Devon.

Career
John's elder brother Henry inherited the family estates, which led to strained relations between the brothers. John's early career as a merchant began with trading in wines from the Iberian Peninsula, leading to a summons to the Treasury on 28 March 1677 to report on Portuguese wines. In the same year he bought Walbrooke House, in the parish of St Stephen Walbrook, and in 1686 he purchased the manor of Wembury. In 1675 he served on the Committee on Trade and Plantations, followed by an appointment in 1678 to the Privy Chamber in 1678, which he held until 1685; he was again appointed in 1690, and remained until 1702. He was appointed to the Commission for Preventing the Export of Wool in 1689, resigning in 1692.

He was elected a Member of Parliament for Plympton Erle in Devon in October 1679, and again for the Parliaments of 1681, 1689 and 1690. He was active on various economic affairs committees, helping pass the Tobacco Act and renew the charter of the East India Company. He was made a Justice of the Peace for Devon in 1689 and an honorary trustee of the National Land Bank. His most significant appointment was as a member of the Board of Trade between 1696 until 23 April 1709. While there he participated in the recoinage debate, produced a report on the judicial system of Barbados and advocated a unified military command for the American colonies. In 1677 he served on a special commission of the East India Company, accusing the directors of monopolising the trade through jobbery and refusing to issue new stock, and also condemned the export of gold bullion, which he saw as suppressing domestic production and employment. As a result, he lobbied the House of Commons in 1689 to establish a new, national company, and presented written and oral testimony to the House of Lords in 1696 showing the harmful effects of importing Indian-manufactured goods and exporting bullion. In response the Lords and Commons opened up the trade lanes to India, establishing a well-regulated company to manage this.

As a by-product of his public career Pollexfen published a series of political and economic essays. After Charles Davenant published his An Essay on the East India Trade in 1697, Pollexfen responded with his essay England and East India Inconsistent in their Manufactures, and also published A Discourse of Trade and Coyn dated 15 July 1696, an extended version of which was republished to counter William Lowndes proposal of recoinage. In 1699 he published A Vindication of some Assertions Relating to Coin and Trade, and a year later republished of Trade. 

He served as a Gentleman of the Privy Chamber 1678-85 (to King Charles II) and 1690-1702 (to King William III).

Marriage
In 1670, aged 32, he married Mary Lawrence, a daughter of  Sir John Lawrence, of the parish of Great St Helens, City of London, a member of the Worshipful Company of Haberdashers, by whom he had issue 2 sons and 2 daughters.

Death
He died shortly before 15 February 1715 and was buried at St Stephen Walbrook in the City of London.

Sources
Crossette, J.S., biography of Pollexfen, John (c.1638–1715), of Walbrook House, London and Wembury, Devon, published in History of Parliament: the House of Commons 1660–1690, ed. B.D. Henning, 1983
Eliott-Drake, Elizabeth (Lady Eliott-Drake) (1840-1923) (née Douglas, a daughter of Sir Robert Andrews Douglas, 2nd Baronet of Glenbervie and wife of Sir Francis George Augustus Fuller-Eliott-Drake, 2nd Baronet (1837–1916) of Nutwell Court and Buckland Monachorum), Family and Heirs of Sir Francis Drake, Vol. II, London, 1911, pp.55-9;

References

1636 births
1715 deaths
Chief Justices of the Common Pleas
English economists
English merchants
English MPs 1680–1681
English MPs 1681
English MPs 1689–1690
English MPs 1690–1695
Members of the Parliament of England for Plympton Erle